Jose (stylised in all caps) is the fifth solo studio album (sixth overall) by Colombian reggaeton singer J Balvin, released on September 2, 2021, through Universal Latin. The album was preceded by six singles: "Otra Noche sin Ti", "7 de Mayo", "Qué Más Pues?", "Otro Fili", "In da Getto", and "Que Locura". The album also includes the standalone single "Un Día (One Day)" with Dua Lipa, Bad Bunny and Tainy. It is the longest studio album Balvin ever released, clocking at 79 minutes.

The album featured production from Tainy, Sky Rompiendo, Skrillex, Taiko, De La Cruz, MVSIS, Mosty, Diplo, Rampa, Maximilian Jaeger, Wondra030, Jasper Helderman, Bas van Daalen, Jota Rosa, Leo RD, Richi López, ErickAnt, Jeff Kleinman, Lelo, Jazz, Lexuz, Keityn, Alex The Big Pieces and Fenix The Producer, alongside collaborations with Sech, Yandel, Skrillex, Myke Towers, Jhay Cortez, Feid, Zion & Lennox, Ozuna, Tokischa, María Becerra, Khalid, Karol G, Nicky Jam, among others.

Commercially, the album reached number 12 on the US Billboard 200 chart, as well as, reaching number one on both the Top Latin Albums and Latin Rhythm Albums chart, with 27,000 album equivalent units being Balvin's fourth album top the chart.

The album was nominated for Best Música Urbana Album at the 64th Annual Grammy Awards.

The Deluxe edition of the album was released on December 17, 2021, featuring 8 more tracks. including a new guest appearance by Arcángel on "F40 (Remix)".

Critical reception

Jose received generally positive reviews. At Metacritic, which assigns a normalized rating out of 100 to reviews from mainstream publications, the album received an average score of 72, based on five reviews, indicating "generally favorable reviews". Antoine-Samuel Mauffette Alavo from Exclaim! gave the album a 9 out of 10, writing that "with the release of Balvin's fifth solo album, JOSE, he is on a mission to humbly recapture his seat on the throne — and undeniably succeeds". Ecleen Luzmila Caraballo from Rolling Stone gave the album three and a half stars out of five, writing that Balvin "promises introspection but instead gives us more of what we’ve come to expect", and that "this isn't a new J Balvin, just the one we've known all along".

In a more mixed review, Robin Murray from Clash rated the album a 6 out of 10, commenting on the length of the album writing that "it struggles under the weight of its 24 track span – clocking in at more than hour, the record at times tries the patience", though he highlighted the tracks "Que Locura", "Una Nota", "Que Mas Pues?" and "Suerte" as high points of the album.

Track listing

Charts

Weekly charts

Year-end charts

Certifications

References 

2021 albums
J Balvin albums
Spanish-language albums
Universal Music Latino albums